The women's discus throw F11-12 had its final held on September 16 at 17:13.

Medalists

Results

References
Final

Athletics at the 2008 Summer Paralympics
2008 in women's athletics